Reginald Ernest Prentice, Baron Prentice, PC (16 July 1923 – 18 January 2001) was a British politician who held ministerial office in both Labour and Conservative Party governments. He was the most senior Labour figure ever to defect to the Conservative Party.

Education and war service
Reg Prentice was born in Croydon, Surrey, and educated at Whitgift School in South Croydon, then at the London School of Economics.  He served in Austria and Italy during World War II.

Early politics
Prentice joined the staff of the Transport and General Workers Union (TGWU) in 1950.

He was a councillor for Whitehorse Manor in the then-County Borough of Croydon from 1949, having stood unsuccessfully in Thornton Heath ward in 1947. He served on the Housing, Libraries, Planning & Development, Water and Reconstruction Committees.

He first stood, unsuccessfully, for parliament in Croydon North in 1950 and 1951, then Streatham in 1955. As Labour Member of Parliament from 1957 for East Ham North, later Newham North East, he was a minister of state in Harold Wilson's first government at Education and Science (1964–66), then as Minister of Public Buildings and Works (1966–67), and finally was put in charge of the still-new Ministry of Overseas Development (1967–69).

In the 1971 Shadow Cabinet election, Prentice just missed out on being elected, finishing in 13th place in the ballot for 12 available places. However in April 1972 the resignations from the shadow cabinet of Harold Lever and George Thomson saw Prentice and 14th placed candidate John Silkin join the body in their place. At the next shadow cabinet election, Prentice topped the poll and he was again re-elected in 1973, this time finishing in third place.

When Labour regained power, he was Secretary of State for Education and Science between 1974 and 1975, subsequently becoming Minister for Overseas Development with a seat in the cabinet until 1976.

In 1975, after his Constituency Labour Party had been infiltrated by Trotskyist Militants, he was deselected. He appealed unsuccessfully from the rostrum of the Labour Party Conference for the National Executive Committee to overturn their endorsement of his deselection.

Switch of party
In 1977, Prentice left the Labour Party after a series of battles with left-wing constituency activists such as Owen Ashworth and joined the Conservative Party.

He was elected as a Conservative Member of Parliament for Daventry in the 1979 general election.  Lady Hesketh was instrumental in him standing for Daventry. He was a Minister of State at the Department of Health and Social Security in Margaret Thatcher's government between 1979 and 1981. He left the government owing to ill health. He was knighted in 1987, the year he stepped down as an MP. On 30 January 1992, he was created Life Peer as Baron Prentice, of Daventry in the County of Northamptonshire.

In the last few years before his death at age 77, he was President of the Devizes Conservative Association.

Death and legacy
Prentice died at his home in Mildenhall, Wiltshire. His daughter, Christine, followed her father as a London Borough of Croydon councillor for Coulsdon East ward from 1992 to 1998.

A biography, which provides an in-depth account of Prentice's party-political transition during the 1970s, was published in 2015: Geoff Horn, Crossing the floor: Reg Prentice and the crisis of British social democracy.

Archives
 Catalogue of the Prentice papers Archives Division, London School of Economics

References

External links 
 

|-

|-

|-

|-

|-

|-

|-

1923 births
2001 deaths
Alumni of the London School of Economics
British Secretaries of State
British Secretaries of State for Education
Conservative Party (UK) life peers
Conservative Party (UK) MPs for English constituencies
Councillors in Greater London
Labour Party (UK) MPs for English constituencies
Members of the Fabian Society
Members of the Greater London Council
Members of the Privy Council of the United Kingdom
People educated at Whitgift School
Politics of the London Borough of Croydon
UK MPs 1955–1959
UK MPs 1959–1964
UK MPs 1964–1966
UK MPs 1966–1970
UK MPs 1970–1974
UK MPs 1974
UK MPs 1974–1979
UK MPs 1979–1983
UK MPs 1983–1987
Councillors in the London Borough of Croydon
Ministers in the Wilson governments, 1964–1970
Life peers created by Elizabeth II